KMHS-FM (91.3 FM, "Pirate Radio 91.3") is a radio station broadcasting a Pop Contemporary Hit Radio music format. Licensed to Coos Bay, Oregon, United States, the station is currently owned by Coos Bay School District No. 9.

References

External links
 
 

MHS-FM
Contemporary hit radio stations in the United States
Coos Bay, Oregon